Loaf is a food shape, typical of bread.

Loaf may also refer to:
 Loaf (album), by moe.
 Loaf (company), a retailer
 Loaf Island, Alaska, US
 Loaf Island (Nunavut), Canada
 Loaf Rock, Antarctica

See also
 Loafer (disambiguation)
 Social loafing
 Loafing (ice hockey)